Visa requirements for Nepali citizens are administrative entry restrictions by the authorities of other states placed on citizens of Nepal. As of 2 July 2019, Nepali citizens had visa-free or visa on arrival access to 38 countries and territories, ranking the Nepali Passport 102nd in terms of travel freedom according to the Henley Passport Index.



Visa requirements map

Visa requirements

See also

Visa policy of Nepal
Nepalese passport
Foreign relations of Nepal

References and Notes
References

Notes

Nepal
Foreign relations of Nepal